Kim Sung-kyung (born February 15, 1972) is a South Korean television personality and actress. Kim joined the broadcasting network SBS in 1993 as a news presenter, notably as the weekend anchor for the SBS Eight O'Clock News. She left SBS in 2002 to go freelance, and also became a planning director for the "edutainment" company SangSang and I in 2007. Kim made her acting debut in 2014 (her older sister is actress Kim Sung-ryung), and has appeared in Korean dramas such as City of the Sun (2015).

News/variety programs

Acting

Television series

Film

References

External links 
 
 
 

1972 births
Living people
South Korean television personalities
South Korean actresses
South Korean television actresses
Hongik University alumni
Yonsei University alumni
People from Seoul